Tooter Turtle is a cartoon about a turtle that first appeared on TV in 1960, as a segment of the King Leonardo and His Short Subjects program. "Tooter Turtle" debuted on NBC, on Saturday, October 15, 1960, and ran for 39 original episodes through July 22, 1961. These episodes were later rerun as backups on other cartoon shows, but no more original episodes were made.

Plot
The plots followed the same general format. Tooter (voiced by Allen Swift) calls on his friend Mr. Wizard the Lizard (voiced by Sandy Becker), an anthropomorphic lizard wearing a wizard cone hat, a robe, and pince-nez eyeglasses. Mr. Wizard lived in a tiny cardboard box at the base of a tall tree. The introductory segment had Tooter knocking on the cardboard box, having "another favor to ask." From inside the box, Mr. Wizard would shrink Tooter small enough to enter through the box's front door and invite him in. Mr. Wizard has the magic to change Tooter's life to some other destiny, usually sending him back in time and to various locales.

As Tooter is fulfilling his destiny, Mr. Wizard narrates the story. When Tooter's trip finally became a catastrophe, Tooter would request help with a cry of "Help me, Mr. Wizard, I don't want to be X any more!" where X was whatever destiny Tooter had entered.  Mr. Wizard would then rescue Tooter with the incantation, "Drizzle, Drazzle, Druzzle, Drome, time for this one to come home." Then, Mr. Wizard would always give Tooter the same advice: "Be just what you is, not what you is not. Folks what do this has the happiest lot."

Critical reception and impact

Mr. Wizard's phrase "Drizzle, Drazzle, Druzzle, Drome; Time for this one to come home"  is echoed in the phrase "Razzle, dazzle, drazzle, drone, Time for This One to Come Home" that was used later by the band The Replacements as a lyric in Hold My Life from the album Tim.

Created and aired during the Vietnam War, although before the Gulf of Tonkin Incident, the episode featuring Tooter traveling back to WW I as a fighter pilot ("Tailspin Tooter") features what one historian has called some of "the most gruesome pro-war imagery" in cartoons of the period.

The 1984 novel Bright Lights, Big City includes childhood recollections of the cartoon series by a narrator while in a similar predicament.

In the 1999 film The Matrix, Neo (Keanu Reeves) calls his operator Tank for an exit from the Matrix, saying, "Mr. Wizard, get me the hell out of here!".

Episode list
(Every Saturday from Oct 15, 1960 to July 22, 1961)

References

External links

1960s American animated television series
1960 American television series debuts
1961 American television series endings
American children's animated comedy television series
Total Television
Animated television series about turtles
NBC original programming